Horizon Chase is a racing video game developed and published by the Brazilian Aquiris Game Studio. It was released on August 20, 2015, for iOS and Android platforms. It is a 3D game inspired by 2D, 16-bit titles. Its soundtrack has Nintendocore influences.

In 2019, an enhanced version, Horizon Chase Turbo, was released for Linux, Windows, PlayStation 4, Nintendo Switch, Xbox One, and PlayStation Vita, the latter via a Play-Asia physical release and one of the last of such for the system. A sequel, Horizon Chase 2, launched for Apple Arcade on September 6, 2022, with an impending release for consoles in 2023.

Gameplay 
In Horizon Chase, the player has to complete races on tracks located all around the world. The player has to pickup fuel refills on the track, in order to continue playing. The player also has to collect coins, as currency, to unlock new tracks. The player can also use nitro boosts to speed up their car. Like a standard race, the player starts every race at the back, and needs to overtake opponents to win. Different weather effects and track types can affect handling and the difficulty of driving.

In the Senna Forever DLC, which also adds a first-person view, players can race Formula One cars in a campaign inspired by Ayrton Senna's career in the sport, with some Grand Prix venues being adapted to the game.

Development 
The game's soundtrack was composed by Barry Leitch, who was contacted due to his work on Top Gear, a racing game released in 1992 for the Super Nintendo Entertainment System. The soundtrack of that game was popular among Brazilian fans, leading to a remix contest. The remixes were later released as part of the soundtrack and a cover of the popular Las Vegas track from Top Gear was included as an Easter Egg.

All versions of Horizon Chase except the PlayStation Vita also has an Ayrton Senna DLC, with profits being donated to the Ayrton Senna Institute.

Easter eggs 
The game's composer also included a hidden marriage proposal to his longtime girlfriend in the game with the assistance of the development team, which was discovered by fans but kept secret until he was ready to share the story.

Courses

Reception 

Horizon Chase received positive reviews, with an aggregate score of 88/100 on Metacritic; Turbo received similarly positive reviews, with the PC scoring 76/100. the PlayStation 4 and Xbox One versions 78/100,  and the Nintendo Switch version receiving an 82/100.

Carter Dodson of TouchArcade rated the game 5/5 stars, praising the game's visual style, soundtrack, and controls, and calling it a "template for how other developers need to do retro-inspired games." Harry Slater of Pocket Gamer rated the game a 9/10, calling it "a bright and brash arcade racer that looks stunning", while saying that its gameplay is good enough to back up its presentation. He noted that the game got "a little grindy at times", though calling it "the type of grind you're happy to wade through". The site awarded the game the "Gold" award. Tom Christiansen of Gamezebo rated the game 3.5/5 stars, calling the visuals "solid" and praising the soundtrack, but saying he disliked the auto-turn assist system that was impossible to turn off, also calling the AI "impossibly fast" and unlocking new cars overly difficult.

Notes 
Play-Asia physical release

References 

2015 video games
IOS games
Racing video games
Single-player video games
Android (operating system) games
Video games developed in Brazil
Indie video games
Video games scored by Barry Leitch
Nintendo Switch games
Video games set in Chile